Bushnell Township is a civil township of Montcalm County in the U.S. state of Michigan.  As of the 2000 census, the township population was 2,111.

History
Bushnell Township was organized in 1850.

Communities
Dean's Mills began around a sawmill in 1865.  It had a post office from 1872 until 1877.

Geography

Demographics
As of the census of 2000, there were 2,111 people, 536 households, and 427 families residing in the township. There were 597 housing units at an average density of 16.8 per square mile (6.5/km2). The racial makeup of the township was 82.66% White, 13.69% African American, 0.62% Native American, 0.47% Asian, 0.05% Pacific Islander, 0.66% from other races, and 1.85% from two or more races. Hispanic or Latino of any race were 3.88% of the population.

There were 536 households, out of which 35.6% had children under the age of 18 living with them, 67.5% were married couples living together, 7.5% had a female householder with no husband present, and 20.3% were non-families. 15.5% of all households were made up of individuals, and 5.8% had someone living alone who was 65 years of age or older.  The average household size was 2.79 and the average family size was 3.08.

In the township the population was spread out, with 20.3% under the age of 18, 8.1% from 18 to 24, 41.6% from 25 to 44, 23.0% from 45 to 64, and 7.1% who were 65 years of age or older.  The median age was 36 years. For every 100 females, there were 184.9 males.  For every 100 females age 18 and over, there were 213.4 males.

The median income for a household in the township was $35,573, and the median income for a family was $38,550. Males had a median income of $31,140 versus $22,375 for females. The per capita income for the township was $13,376.  About 9.2% of families and 14.6% of the population were below the poverty line, including 20.5% of those under age 18 and 10.1% of those age 65 or over.

References

Notes

Sources

Townships in Montcalm County, Michigan
1850 establishments in Michigan
Populated places established in 1850
Townships in Michigan